Detroit Beer Co. is a brewpub located on Broadway Street in downtown Detroit, Michigan, United States. Detroit Beer Co. opened in the fall of 2003 and is part of a trio of local breweries, including the Royal Oak Brewery (1995) and the Rochester Mills Beer Co. (1998). The Detroit Beer Co. was launched by Drew Ciora and Mike Pelsz, who purchased and renovated the historical Hartz building at a cost of $5.3 million. The Hartz Building was an early 20th-century surgical supply store and was renovated to accommodate a restaurant, brewery equipment, office space, and even a loft apartment. Within close proximity of both Comerica Park and Ford Field, is readily accessible for fans of those teams within the Motor City.

History 
Significant to the development of Detroit Beer Co. is its location in Detroit, Michigan. The city of Detroit continues to work hard at its revival and renaissance begun in the 1990s and Detroit Beer Co. has become a part that revival, as well. Detroit Beer Co. is housed in the historic 100-year-old Hartz Building at 1529 Broadway Street; it is part of the Broadway Avenue Historic District located on a single block along Broadway Avenue between Gratiot and East Grand River. The Hartz building is in the center of a cultural and sporting spot in Detroit, with the Detroit Opera house standing across the street, and Comerica Park and Ford Field both short walks away. The six-story Hartz building was built in 1902; it was named after J. Frederick Hartz, who was Chairman of the Board of the J.F. Hartz Company, a medical and surgical supply company. Malcomson & Higginbotham, architects, 1902.  J. Frederick Hartz, the namesake of this building, was Chairman of the board of the J.F. Hartz Company, suppliers of medical supplies and surgical instruments for physicians, nurses, hospitals and sick rooms. Malcomson and Higginson, architects, were issued the building permit for the construction of the building for Hartz. It was to cost an estimated $15,000. Also located in the Hartz Building in 1907 were Silverman Bernd, cigar manufacturer; the Detroit Medical Journal
Company; E.C. Moore & son Company, dental specialties; Ideal Belt Company, Illustrated medical Journal Company, and J.H. Bishop Company, clothing manufacturers. The Hartz Building was originally built as a three-story brick building articulated as a single bay.
A fourth floor was added in 1926/27 (Alt. permit 7433-A, 11/30/1926) at a cost of $25,000. Stone quoins framed its front facade and bands of seven windows with transoms filled the single horizontal opening per floor above the store level. The first floor was remodeled in the early 1990s, and continued at that time to retain its recessed entrance...

The building was thriving in the early 1990s with the support and encouragement of Ray Parker of RFP Associates, Inc., (a commercial and residential real estate business founded in 1988) who inspired Detroit Businesses ~ Wanda's Interior Images, Moore African Art, Kente Kurtains & More, Detroit-Windsor Dance Academy, LaCouture, and Robert Lett to lease space in The Hartz Building. At that time, Ray Parker's passion for and love of architecture spoke volumes in relation to his commitment to rebuilding and revitalizing downtown Detroit.  With The Greystone Jazz Museum situated right next door to 1529 Broadway, all of the businesses collaborated by participating in the Greater Downtown Detroit Historic Association, The Fox Theatre Tours, Gallery Crawls, and the NAACP's support and promotion of African American Businesses in Downtown Detroit.  The momentum built, and many News Articles followed, sparking further interest and attention to the new businesses in The Hartz Building.  The Grand Opening of the three first floor businesses of The Hartz Building—Wanda's Interior Images, Moore African Art, and Kente Kurtains & More, had over 750 invited guests in attendance.  Including the Mayor of the City of Detroit, City Council Members, Judges, Members of the Board of Directors of Boysville of Michigan, NAACP Officials, and many Detroit Business Owners.  News Articles followed with write-ups in The Detroit News, The Detroit Free Press, Crain's Detroit Business, Metro Times, On Detroit, and many others.  The Detroit Opera House broke ground, restored, and reopened directly across the street (located at 1526 Broadway Street) shortly thereafter.  Architect Eric J. Hill participated in an extensive restoration of The Detroit Opera House which reopened in 1996.

In the early 2000s the Hartz building underwent a complete renovation by Kraemer Design Group with the Detroit Beer Co. in mind; the building also has mixed-use functions. The Kraemer Design Group planned a brewery and pub in the basement, first and second floor, loft offices on the third, fourth and fifth, and finally a loft apartment on the sixth floor. While the renovations updated the building to fit the current surrounding locale, the historic character of the building was preserved and it is being considered for a listing on the National Register of Historic places.

The Beer
Detroit Beer Co. has an extensive selection of award winning ales and lagers that are brewed on-site. The brewhouse was constructed to fit the space requirements of the historic Hartz building; the basement houses four fermentation tanks. The design of the brewhouse, along with the sophisticated beer delivery system, permits the brewery to offer up to 8 house beers on tap at any time. The brewmaster, Kevin Rodger, oversees the brewery operation.

Detroit Beer Co. has seven beers offered year round: Broadway Light, Detroit Lager, Detroit Red, Local 1529 IPA, and The Detroit Dwarf (named after the "Nain Rouge" dwarf who haunts the city and serves as a harbinger of doom), The People Mover Porter (named after Detroit's downtown public transportation system) and Steam Tunnel Stout.

Awards 
The company's first award was won at the first annual Michigan Brewers Olympics in 2004.  It is still on display behind the bar, even though nobody knows what it is anymore (it's the one with the king, holding a scepter and flanked by roller skates).  Events included a race where contestants picked up a 55-pound bag of grain and ran 15 yards to a pallet and stacked it, 20 times, and then had to slam a can of Stroh's, a Keg toss, a quiz, and, finally, an obstacle course.

At the Great American Beer Festival, the Detroit Dwarf took the bronze in the category of "Beer with Yeast" in 2004 and gold in the category "Düsseldorf Alt" in 2008. The Detroit Lager won bronze for "Bohemian Pilsener" in 2007.

The Detroit Dwarf also took home the silver medal for "Düsseldorf Alt" at the World Beer Cup in 2010.

At the World Expo of Beer, Lager holds a gold medal once again for "Bohemian Pilsener".

A since discontinued brew, St. Brigid's Oatmeal Stout was awarded the gold for "Oatmeal Stout" at the Michigan Beer Cup in 2004.

Le Nain Rouge
The famed Detroit Dwarf actually has some historical significance. Its mascot, the Nain Rouge (French for "Red Dwarf") has been known as the mythical demon responsible for all of the hardships that have befallen the city of Detroit over the decades. The brew was given its namesake for the "devilish" hops flavor balanced by a red malty undertone, each characteristic of a German Alt-style beer.

References

External links 
 

Beer brewing companies based in Michigan
Companies based in Detroit
2003 establishments in Michigan